JMC Communities is a property developer in Florida. It developed the Sandpearl Resort on Clearwater Beach, built the Mandalay Beach Club and Belle Harbor condominium projects on Clearwater Beach and is planning to build a 6-story condo development (Rowland Place) in downtown St. Petersburg, Florida. JMC previously built the Ovation "mega-tower" in St. Pete. The CEO of JMC Communities is Mike Cheezem.

Services
JMC provides a robust service business plan such as development/contracting general, various project or construction know-how, sales and marketing, coordinating home layout, in-house warranty, property management, environmental construction techniques and closing services.

References

External links
 JMC Communities website

Real estate companies of the United States
1978 establishments in Florida
Real estate companies established in 1978
American companies established in 1978